NOTAM Code is an aeronautical radiotelegraph and radiotelephony brevity code used to transmit information about radio navigation aids, airports, lighting facilities, dangers to aircraft, and actions related to search and rescue. All NOTAM Codes start with the letter Q, to distinguish them from radio call signs, and always consist of five letters (counting the Q), to avoid confusing them with Q codes. These codes are defined by ICAO Doc 8400: ICAO Abbreviations and Codes.

Second and third letters

See also 
 Q code
 Brevity code

References